
Gmina Wysoka is an urban-rural gmina (administrative district) in Piła County, Greater Poland Voivodeship, in west-central Poland.

It is situated in the historical region of Krajna.

Villages
Apart from the town of Wysoka, Gmina Wysoka contains the villages and settlements of Bądecz, Czajcze, Gmurowo, Jeziorki Kosztowskie, Kijaszkowo, Kostrzynek, Młotkowo, Mościska, Nowa Rudna, Rudna, Sędziniec, Stare, Tłukomy, Wysoczka, Wysoka Mała and Wysoka Wielka.

Neighbouring gminas
Gmina Wysoka is bordered by the gminas of Białośliwie, Kaczory, Krajenka, Łobżenica, Miasteczko Krajeńskie, Wyrzysk and Złotów.

References
Polish official population figures 2006

Wysoka
Piła County